Riverton is an unincorporated village and census-designated place (CDP) in the town of Barkhamsted, Litchfield County, Connecticut, United States. It is in the northwest corner of the town, bordered to the north by the town of Hartland in Hartford County. The village sits at the confluence of the Still River with the West Branch of the Farmington River.

Riverton was first listed as a CDP prior to the 2020 census.  of the village center comprise the Riverton Historic District.

References 

Census-designated places in Litchfield County, Connecticut
Census-designated places in Connecticut